Engelbrekt Church is a protected church located in the Lärkstaden area of Stockholm, Sweden. Its located at Östermalm and belongs to the Church of Sweden and is parish church for Engelbrekt Parish in the Diocese of Stockholm. It was designed by architect Lars Israel Wahlman in the National Romantic style and completed in 1914. It is one of the largest churches in Stockholm, with 1,400 seats.

In the spirit of romantic nationalism, the church was named after Engelbrekt Engelbrektsson – a Swedish 15th century rebel leader and national hero. It was built atop a hill in the years 1910–14, after a design competition held in 1906. The rock on which the church is standing was left mostly intact, in accordance to the urban planning ideals at the time, giving it a naturally elevated position in the city.

Internationally appreciated in architectural circles, the church has not been subjected to any major changes since its inauguration and is regarded as a paragon of the Swedish Art Nouveau era and the National Romantic style.

See also
 List of churches in Stockholm
 List of highest church naves

References

External links 

 
 Panorama of the interior 

20th-century Church of Sweden church buildings
Churches in the Diocese of Stockholm (Church of Sweden)
Art Nouveau church buildings in Sweden
Churches in Stockholm
Churches completed in 1914
Art Nouveau architecture in Stockholm
National Romantic architecture in Sweden